Statistics of the Football Tournament in the 1889/1890 season.

Overview
It was contested by 7 teams, and Akademisk Boldklub won the championship. The format was slightly unusual in that all games had to have a winner.Therefore, if the match was level after 90 minutes, extra time was played.  If the match was still level after extra time, the match was replayed until a winner emerged.

League standings

References
Denmark - List of final tables (RSSSF)

1889–90 in Danish football
Top level Danish football league seasons
The Football Tournament seasons
Denmark